Rullán is a surname. Notable people with the surname include:

Francisco Rovira Rullán (born 1977), Puerto Rican art dealer
Juan Rullán Rivera (1884–?), Puerto Rican politician
Rafael Rullán (born 1952), Spanish basketball player

Spanish-language surnames